Lucy Carrington Wertheim (née Pearson; 4 April 1883, in Seedley, Pendletom, Lancashire – 1971, in Brighton) was an English gallery owner who founded the Twenties Group of "English artists in their twenties" in 1930 and was Christopher Wood's main patron before his death.

Lucy Carrington Pearson married Mari Paul Johan Wertheim (1878–1952) in 1906. He was born in the Netherlands and became a British citizen in 1915.

She, with her husband, ran galleries in London, Brighton and Derbyshire and was known for encouraging many young artists and sculptors. In the 1920s she bought many works by Henry Moore and encouraged Cedric Morris.

In 1930 she opened her first gallery at 3-5 Burlington Gardens, Mayfair, London. It has been suggested that it was the artist Frances Hodgkins who finally persuaded or perhaps goaded Mrs Wertheim to move from enthusiastic supporter of 'modern art' to a fully fledged gallery owner. Wertheim recalls the incident in her 1947 book 'Adventure in Art' - "Frances exclaimed to my husband, 'Your wife should open a gallery for us poor artists: her enthusiasm would make it a success!'...Those words however spoken more than half in jest, sowed a seed in my mind that was to bear fruit later."

In the early 1960s she lent works to decorate the then-new and radical University of Sussex, near Brighton.

Those either exhibited at her gallery or supported by Wertheim included Walter Sickert, Rodney Gladwell, Humphrey Slater, Helmut Kolle, Vivin Hume, Phelan Gibb, John Bigge and John Banting, Henry Stockley, Nando Manetti, Rowland Suddaby, Leslie Hurry, Isla Rodmell, Kenneth Hall, Basil Rakoczi, John Melville, Feliks Topolski, Charles Higgins (Pic), David Burton, Cedric Morris, Alfred Wallis, Frances Hodgkins, Elizabeth Rivers, Mostyn Lewis, Jose Christopherson, David Gommon, Kathleen Walne and  Christopher Wood amongst many others.

See also
William Henry Pearson (Lucy Wertheim's father, a noted botanist)

References 

1883 births
1971 deaths
Art dealers from London
English art collectors
Women art collectors
20th-century English businesspeople